Gorayk is a village and the center of the Gorayk Municipality of the Syunik Province in Armenia. A large reservoir called the Spandaryan Reservoir lies to the southeast of the village.

Toponymy 
The village was previously known as Bazarchay.

Demographics

Population 
The National Statistical Service of the Republic of Armenia (ARMSTAT) reported its population as 580 in 2010, down from 632 at the 2001 census.

Gallery

References 

Populated places in Syunik Province
Communities in Syunik Province